(awarded posthumously)

Eliška Misáková (12 October 1926 in Kojetice – 14 August 1948 in London) was a Czech gymnast who was selected to attend the 1948 Summer Olympics.

Misáková was born in Kojetice, in the Třebíč District of Vysočina. Her parents both died before her in 1948. She was diagnosed with poliomyelitis soon after arrival in London, and isolated in a local hospital ward, with access to an iron lung. Her place on the team was taken by Věra Růžičková.

Misáková died during the competition, after four days in the Uxbridge Isolation Hospital. The Czechoslovak team, including her sister Miloslava, went on to earn the gold medal. Their flag was raised at the medal ceremony with a black border of mourning, and Misáková became the only athlete to ever be awarded a posthumous Olympic medal. Because of the infectious nature of her illness, her body was cremated before repatriation and her ashes returned to Prague in an urn.

References

1926 births
1948 deaths
Czech female artistic gymnasts
Olympic deaths
Olympic gymnasts of Czechoslovakia
Gymnasts at the 1948 Summer Olympics
People from Třebíč District
Deaths from polio
Sportspeople from the Vysočina Region